Oblivia is a genus of flowering plant in the tribe Heliantheae within the family Asteraceae.

 Species
 Oblivia ceronii H.Rob. - Perú, Ecuador
 Oblivia mikanioides (Britt.) Strother - Bolivia, Perú, Ecuador, Colombia, Panamá, Venezuela
 Oblivia simplex (V.M.Badillo) H.Rob. - Venezuela

References

 
Asteraceae genera
Taxonomy articles created by Polbot